KHKU (94.3 FM) is a mainstream AC station licensed to Hanapepe, Hawaii, serving Kauai. The studio and office facility is located at 4357 Rice Street, Suite 201, in downtown Lihu'e, the county seat of Kaua'i County.  The station is owned by Kauai Broadcast Partners LLC, whose managing member is Larry Fuss. Syndicated programming includes the Murphy, Sam & Jodi morning show, Throwback Nation Radio with Tony Lorino, Open House Party with Joe Breezy and Intelligence For Your Life with John Tesh.  The callsign KHKU is derived from the Hawaiian word "Haku", meaning "Star."

References

External links
KHKU's website

Hot adult contemporary radio stations in the United States
HKU
Radio stations established in 2014
2014 establishments in Hawaii